Adnate may refer to:

 Adnation, in botany, the fusion of two or more whorls of a flower
 Adnate, in mycology, a classification of lamellae (gills)
 Conjoined twins